Children's Island Sanitarium was a sanitarium on Children's Island in Essex County, Massachusetts from 1886 until 1946 where many chronically ill children spent the summer, where the outdoor, ocean air might make them better.

Children's Island was for many years the location of a failed Island House (Lowell island house), and was finally donated by its final owner, Mr. Fredrick Rindge, to develop what became known as the "Children's Island Sanitarium, a corporation duly established...subject to the following conditions ‘That said property shall be used by the Children's Island Sanitarium only for the use and purpose for which said corporation was organized...and the property will revert and reinvest in me and my heirs and assigns.'” Additionally, he stressed that “children of every race, color and religion should be received there." The Society of Saint Margaret of Boston were chosen to run the Sanitarium. This society was already very involved in the Children's Hospital in Boston and the Sea-Shore Home in Winthrop, so its members had experience with the recovery of ill or crippled children.
	In the late 19th century, “sea air [was] looked upon as almost a panacea for that class of disorders of nutrition which is shown in the disorders of joints and bones,...(and) in adopting the sea coast plan for their Institute the managers of the Lowell Island Sanitorium...hope that the beneficial effect of sea air would be especially manifest in children suffering from chronic malnutrition, a belief which is entertained by all medical authorities.”. On July 11, 1886 the Children's Island Sanitarium was opened for nearly two months and hosted a total of 150 children “exposed to the summer diseases of crowded cities, or to children...troubled by the affliction popularly called ‘rickets’.”
	The children were carefully selected and initially "boys under 10 and girls of any age or race, suffering from the chronic diseases which are benefited by a marine atmosphere, such as rickets, hip, spinal diseases, etc.; also, for children convalescing from severe operations" were eligible for admission. "Children (were) admitted free when circumstances demand(ed). The usual stay is a fortnight, which (was) extended when necessary."
	Despite the belief that the Children's Island Sanitarium was a tuberculosis sanitarium, no child with a contagious disease, especially active tuberculosis, was admitted. Joint and bone infections (osteomyelitis), both TB and non-TB, are not contagious and these children were admitted. Many other children who were there suffered deformities from rickets or vitamin D deficiency.
	In addition to children, the Sanitarium allowed “working women in need of a holiday (to) be received on the payment of a sufficient sum to defray the cost of their board.”

A journalist from the Boston Transcript spent a day in September, 1890 on the Island and wrote:

“Children’s island sanitarium...was carried on by the Sisters (of St. Margaret) for 15 years; at the end of that time the old house had gone to pieces and a new building was erected, but in this there were only accommodations for the children and those in charge of them. This changed the whole character of the work and in 1900 the Mother decided to give it up. Subsequently, a new Board of Managers to oversee the operation of the sanitarium was formed with Dr. Charles E. Inches as president (replaced by Phillip L. Saltonstall in 1905.), and Mrs. Lucy W. Davis as superintendent. It seems that most of the tasks previously carried out by the Sisters were now carried out by volunteers who were "young women who give their time and services out of love for the little people and interest in the cause. They remain on the average, three weeks, and are on either morning or afternoon duty for a week at a time-four in the morning, three in the afternoon."

Other changes included allowing children as young as 18 months and boys up to age 14, though most children were between four and twelve. One volunteer, Maude S. Curtiss, wrote an article for The American Journal of Nursing describing life on the island:

Another volunteer, Eleanor Fairchild Cadwallader worked in the 1930s and recalls:

Another account by a volunteer in 1940:

A large financial supporter of the Children's Island Sanitarium, the Boston Community Fund, withdrew support necessitating the closure of the Sanitarium. In 1946, the trustees voted “not to use Children’s Island for the purposes for which this corporation is organized after November 1, 1946; and to surrender possession thereof on that date to the heirs and assigns of Frederick H. Rindge.”.

References

Hospital buildings completed in 1886
Hospitals in Essex County, Massachusetts
Defunct hospitals in Massachusetts